Eustigmatophytes are a small group (17 genera; ~107 species) of eukaryotic forms of algae that includes marine, freshwater and soil-living species.

All eustigmatophytes are unicellular, with coccoid cells and polysaccharide cell walls.  Eustigmatophytes contain one or more yellow-green chloroplasts, which contain chlorophyll a and the accessory pigments violaxanthin and β-carotene.  Eustigmatophyte zoids (gametes) possess a single or pair of flagella, originating from the apex of the cell.  Unlike other heterokontophytes, eustigmatophyte zoids do not have typical photoreceptive organelles (or eyespots); instead an orange-red eyespot outside a chloroplast is located at the anterior end of the zoid.

Ecologically, eustigmatophytes occur as photosynthetic autotrophs across a range of systems.  Most  eustigmatophyte genera live in freshwater or in soil, although Nannochloropsis contains marine species of picophytoplankton (2–4 μm).

The class was erected to include some algae previously classified in the Xanthophyceae.

Classification
 Class Eustigmatophyceae Hibberd & Leedale 1970
 Order Eustigmatales Hibberd 1981
 Genus Paraeustigmatos Fawley, Nemcová, & Fawley 2019
 Family Eustigmataceae Hibberd 1981 [Chlorobothryaceae Pascher 1925; Pseudocharaciopsidaceae Lee & Bold ex Hibberd 1981]
 Genus ?Ellipsoidion Pascher 1937
 Genus Chlorobotrys Bohlin 1901
 Genus Eustigmatos Hibberd 1981
 Genus Pseudocharaciopsis Lee & Bold 1973
 Genus Pseudostaurastrum Chodat 1921
 Genus Vischeria Pascher 1938 - 16 spp.
 Family Monodopsidaceae Hibberd 1981 [Loboceae Hegewald 2007]
 Genus Microchloropsis Fawley, Jameson & Fawley 2015
 Genus Monodopsis Hibberd 1981
 Genus Nannochloropsis Hibberd 1981
 Genus Pseudotetraedriella Hegewald & Padisák 2007
 Family Neomonodaceae Amaral et al. 2020
 Genus ?Botryochloropsis Preisig & Wilhelm 1989
 Genus Characiopsiella Amaral et al. 2020
 Genus Munda Amaral et al. 2020
 Genus Neomonodus Amaral et al. 2020
 Genus Pseudellipsoidion Neustupa & Nemková 2001
 Order Goniochloridales Fawley, Elias & Fawley 2013
 Family Goniochloridaceae 
 Genus Goniochloris Geitler 1928
 Genus Pseudostaurastrum Chodat 1921
 Genus Tetraedriella Pascher 1930
 Genus Trachydiscus H.Ettl 1964
 Genus Vacuoliviride Nakayama et al. 2015

Phylogeny 
Phylogeny of Eustigmatophyceae based on the work of Amaral et al 2020

References

Ochrophyta
Heterokont classes
Algae classes